Ceresole Alba is a comune (municipality) in the Province of Cuneo in the Piedmont region of Italy, located about  southeast of Turin and about  northeast of Cuneo.

Ceresole Alba borders the following municipalities: Baldissero d'Alba, Carmagnola, Montaldo Roero, Monteu Roero, Poirino, Pralormo, and Sommariva del Bosco.

The Battle of Ceresole was an encounter between a French army and the combined forces of Spain and the Holy Roman Empire during the Italian War of 1542–46. The lengthy engagement took place on 11 April 1544 outside the village.

References

Cities and towns in Piedmont
Roero